Holiday City – Silver Ridge is an unincorporated Master-planned community located   within Berkeley Township in Ocean County, New Jersey, United States, near Toms River. The entire community has a total population of 21,631 in five separate census-designated places according to the 2000 United States Census. The subdivision is divided into four sections: Holiday City-Berkeley (2000 population of 13,884), Holiday City South (4,047), Holiday Heights (2,389) and Silver Ridge Park (1,211). The community consists of many strip malls, a mini mall containing over 20 stores, doctors offices, real estate offices, banks and a hospital. The main roadways are Mule Road and Jamaica Boulevard.

The development is an age-restricted adult community and is located off of Route 37 just west of the Garden State Parkway.

Sections and neighborhoods

Holiday City
In the Holiday City communities, homes are detached, ranch style built on minimum  lots, with some lots larger to accommodate larger models.

Holiday City consists of five separate communities, each with its own homeowners association and amenities:
Holiday City Berkeley
Holiday City Carefree
Holiday City West
Holiday City South
Holiday Heights

Silver Ridge
In the Silver Ridge Communities, homes are single-story detached on a crawl space, each with attached garage, and situated on  lots. Floor plans vary considerably. In addition to living room, dining room, eat-in-kitchen, attached garage, one or two bedrooms and one or two bathrooms, homes may also include family rooms/dens, open or closed porches, sun rooms, patios and decks.

The adult communities of Silver Ridge Park consist of four separate areas, each with its own homeowners association and amenities. These are:
Silver Ridge Park (East)
Silver Ridge Park West
Silver Ridge Park - Westerly Extension
Silver Ridge Park North

External links
Holiday City - Silver Ridge Park at CityData

Berkeley Township, New Jersey
Planned cities in the United States
Unincorporated communities in Ocean County, New Jersey